The fourth season of the History channel television series Top Shot premiered on February 14, 2012.

The season contains twelve episodes, and was filmed in Santa Clarita, California. The season was won by Chris Cheng.

Gregory Littlejohn, Kyle Sumpter, Chee Kwan, William Bethards, and Gabby Franco returned for Top Shot: All-Stars. Littlejohn finished in 16th, Kwan finished in 14th, Sumpter finished in 13th, Franco finished in 12th, and Bethards finished in 5th, meaning that Season 4 was the only season without a representative in the finale.

Contestants

Contestant progress

 The player's team won the team challenge (Episodes 1 - 8)
 The player(s) won an individual challenge, or placed high enough to earn immunity from elimination for the current round (Episodes 9 - 11); the player(s) won an elimination challenge to avoid elimination (Episode 12)
 The player's team lost the team challenge, but the player was not nominated for elimination (Episodes 1 - 8); the player(s) lost an individual challenge, but was not nominated for elimination (Episode 9 - 11)
 The player was nominated for elimination, but won an elimination challenge (Episodes 1 - 11); the player was in the bottom two shooters, but won an elimination challenge (Episode 12)
 The player lost an elimination challenge and was eliminated
 The player(s) was eliminated in the preliminary challenge of Episode 1
 The player came in second in the final challenge
 The player won the $100,000 grand prize and the title of Top Shot in the final challenge

Episodes

Episode 1: "Sweating Bullets"

No practice sessions were held for the preliminary and team challenges. The trainer for the elimination challenge was Garry James, historical firearms expert and former United States Army ordnance officer.

Episode 2: "In the Trenches"

The trainer for both challenges was Craig "Sawman" Sawyer, Navy SEALs instructor and former sniper.

Episode 3: "Shotgun Showdown"

The trainer for the team challenge was Chris Reed, the winner of Season 2. The trainer for the elimination challenge was Taran Butler, national/world shotgun champion.

Episode 4: "Crossbow Crossfire"

The trainer for the team challenge was Chris Brackett, archery expert. The trainer for the elimination challenge was Julie Golob, national/world pistol champion.

Episode 5: "Swing Into Action"

The trainer for the team challenge was Russ Combs, national flintlock champion. The trainer for the elimination challenge was Steve Gilcreast, former Army Ranger and SWAT team leader.

Episode 6: "Blast from the Past"

The trainer for the team challenge was Rick Pohlers, cannon expert. The trainer for the elimination challenge was Jack Dagger, primitive weapons expert.

Episode 7: "Trick Shot Shoot Off"

The trainer for both challenges was Robert Vogel, 11-time national shooting champion.

Episode 8: "The Mad Minute"

The trainer for both challenges was Iain Harrison, the winner of Season 1.

The "mad minute" originated as a pre-World War I term used by British riflemen during training to describe scoring 15 hits onto a 12" round target at 300 yd within one minute using a bolt-action rifle. The term still exists in modern military parlance to describe any short period of intense weapons fire.

Episode 9: "The Longest Shot"

The teams were dissolved in this episode. All players received green shirts and began to compete against each other for the rest of the season. After the individual challenge, all players voted for one of the players who had not won immunity. The top two vote-getters then competed in an elimination challenge as in previous episodes.

The trainers for both challenges were Kelly Bachand and George Reinas, contestants from Seasons 1 and 2.

Episode 10: "SWAT Throwdown"

The trainer for both challenges was Jeff Gonzales, former Navy SEAL and counter-terrorism instructor.

Episode 11: "Have Machine Gun Will Travel"

The trainer for both challenges was Craig "Sawman" Sawyer, Navy SEALs instructor and former sniper.

Episode 12: "The Ultimate Prize"

No practice sessions were held in this episode. The six individual shooters eliminated prior to the final challenge returned to watch it, along with Allen Treadwell, a professional shooter sponsored by Bass Pro Shops.

Epilogue: Behind the Bullet
Premiering after the final episode, Top Shot Season Four Behind the Bullet, was a one-hour documentary involving behind-the-scene interviews and footage taken before, during, and after the season four competition. At the end of the episode, the show profiled each of the contestants, post-competition.

 Frank Melloni has opened his own firearms training academy.
 Keith Gibson is starting a new grass-fed dairy farm.
 Michelle Viscusi recently completed a photo shoot for Maxim.
 Colin Gallagher is back working as a Police Sergeant in Wichita. He has returned the bandana to Greg (Episode 4).
 Iggy Keyes has been shooting in local gun competitions.
 Tim Trefren recently left on his first trip of the spring bear-hunting season.
 Dylan Fletcher has started shooting locally in the USPSA, IPSC and IDPA.
 Terry Vaughan continues to travel as a professional speaker on body language.
 Gabby Franco is back in Miami teaching precision shooting.
 William Bethards will be competing at the National Rifle and Pistol Championship.
 Chee Kwan has applied to become a U.S. Marshal.
 Kyle Sumpter has been running lethal force and firearms training courses.
 Augie Malekovich has been teaching air rifle shooting to paralyzed veterans.
 Gary Shank has started a new job selling firearms.
 Gregory Littlejohn has been shooting USPSA matches. He spent most of his $6000 from Bass Pro Shops on ammo.
 Chris Cheng is excited to start his pro shooting career. He has yet to spend any of his championship winnings.

Nomination Range

 Episode 1: Forrest and Craig were eliminated in a preliminary challenge.
 Episode 9: Gabby was eliminated due to having the worst performance in the individual challenge. At the nomination range, William and Kyle tied for second place with 2 votes each; Kyle won a shoot-off to gain immunity.
 Episode 11: Gary and Kyle tied for second place with one vote each; Gary won a shoot-off to gain immunity.

References

2012 American television seasons